Rostamabad (also Romanized as Rostamābād and Rustamābād) is a village in Hoseynabad-e Kordehha Rural District, in the Central District of Aradan County, Semnan Province, Iran. At the 2006 census, its population was 307, in 95 families.

References 

Populated places in Aradan County